Within the Royal Malaysia Police, officers and personnel are routinely armed. Special police officers are usually trained to a higher standard than regular personnel, because they are likely to be the officers required to enter besieged premises. The vast majority of firearms used by the Malaysian Police are semi-automatic and fully automatic.

Use order 
 
Following an Inspector-General of Police Firm Order D222, firearms use was deemed as needed. For example, using firearms to dismiss an illegal assembly or riot as shown in the Public Security manual. Use of firearms may be needed to repel an attack on top police station or police observation posts. Also, firearms could be used when an officer and/or members may be killed or hurt or weapons seized/station or property captured or destroyed. Additionally, prisoner escape could warrant such use. Police officers can use the firearm during roadblock duty or Narcotics Department operations, Criminal Investigation Department, Traffic Police and all branches that are carrying out duties where policeman life or public property is in jeopardy.

Standard weapons 

Firearms in service vary between police forces in Malaysia, due to individual Constables and Police Authorities dictating the number of firearms officers and police firearms available to each force.

Despite being armed, police constables still carry the standard issue T-batons, pepper spray and Hiatts Speedcuffs as well as the Walther P99 standard issue sidearm.

The following standard firearms are commonly issued to Royal Malaysia Police officers.

Specialist weapons 
In some circumstances, special firearms can be authorised for use in police special operations and counter-terrorism unit.  The following have in the past been on issue to special operations.

Heavy weapons 
The General Operations Force armour corps and Marine Operations Force use a range of heavier weapons up to automatic cannon of 30mm calibre deployed on the armour personnel carrier and patrol vessels.

Former weapons

Procurement

See also
 List of equipment of the Malaysian Army
 List of equipment of the Royal Malaysian Navy
 List of equipment of the Royal Malaysian Air Force
 List of aircraft of the Malaysian Armed Forces
 List of equipment of the Malaysian Maritime Enforcement Agency
 List of vehicles of the Royal Malaysian Police

References 

Royal Malaysia Police
Police weapons
Law enforcement in Malaysia
Law enforcement-related lists